The Prime Minister of Cuba, officially known as the President of the Council of Ministers between 1976 and 2019, is the head of government of Cuba and the chairman of the Council of Ministers (cabinet). The Prime Minister is the third-highest office in Cuba, after the First Secretary of the Communist Party of Cuba and the President of Cuba, and the second-highest state office.

The office of Prime Minister was first instituted in 1940 in accordance with the provisions of the Constitution of Cuba as amended in that year. The first Prime Minister of Cuba was Carlos Saladrigas Zayas (1900–1957), the nephew of former President Alfredo Zayas. The prime minister was also sometimes referred to as "Premier". Between 1940 and 1959, Cuba saw fifteen changes of prime minister; Félix Lancís Sánchez exercised the role twice (1944–1945 and 1950–1951) while Fulgencio Batista held the position concurrently with that of President of Cuba for one month (April 1952) following a military coup. Fidel Castro became prime minister in 1959, replacing José Miró Cardona.

On 2 December 1976 a new national constitution, restructuring the government, came into force. Under that constitution, the Prime Minister's post was effectively merged with that of the President, who served as chairman of both the Council of State and the Council of Ministers of Cuba.

The 1976 constitution created a governmental structure that partly copied that of the Soviet Union. However, unlike in the Soviet Union, where the Presidium of the Supreme Soviet and the Council of Ministers were distinct posts, the Cuban Council of State and Council of Ministers were chaired by the same person. Furthermore, unlike English and Russian, Spanish does not distinguish between the terms "chairman/председатель" and "president/президент", translating both as "presidente".

On 24 February 2019, another constitution – Cuba's current – was adopted in a referendum. Under it, the government was again re-organized, and the separate posts of President and Prime Minister were restored. Manuel Marrero was named prime minister for a 5-year term by President Miguel Díaz-Canel on 21 December 2019, under the new constitutional provisions, and was approved unanimously by the National Assembly to serve the same day.

List of prime ministers

See also

Elections in Cuba
Council of Ministers (Cuba)
President of Cuba
List of presidents of Cuba

Footnotes

Government ministers of Cuba

ja:キューバの首相
pt:Anexo:Lista de primeiros-ministros de Cuba